The Emrax 228 is a Slovenian electric motor for powering electric aircraft and other applications, designed and produced by Emrax d.o.o of Kamnik. The company was formerly called Enstroj and based in Radomlje.

Design and development
It has a 98% efficiency. The low working rpm of the engine means that it can turn a propeller at efficient speeds without the need for a reduction drive.

Specifications (Emrax 228)

See also

References

External links

Aircraft electric engines